Pitcalnie is a small hamlet  on the north east corner of Nigg Bay in Ross-shire, Scottish Highlands and is in the Scottish council area of Highland.

Populated places in Ross and Cromarty